Differently is the debut album by Australian singer Cassie Davis and was released on 14 August 2009. Davis herself is writing and producing most of the album, with the help of producers Printz Board, Rodney Jerkins and Wayne Wilkins.

Singles 
 "Like It Loud" was released for digital download on 22 January 2009 with the CD single following a day later. It reached number eleven on the Australian ARIA Singles Chart, stayed on the top fifty for twelve weeks and was recently certified gold with shipments of over 35,000 copies.
 "Differently" featuring Gym Class Heroes' Travis McCoy, was released to Australian radio in March 2009 and physically on 24 April 2009. It debuted at number fifty on the ARIA Singles Chart but has risen to number twenty-nine. It was certified GOLD in September 2009
 "Do It Again" was released as the third single in August 2009. It eventually peaked at #24 on the Singles Chart.
 "No More" is the fourth single from the album and was released to Australian radio on 28 September 2009. It debuted on the Australian ARIA SIngles Chart on 6 December 2009 at #100,and rose 10 spots to 90 the following week to have a new peak on the aria charts.
 "Don't Wanna Dance" was released on 9 April 2010. The video was released in early March. It is also the final single released from the album.

Charts

End of year charts

Track listing and writing credits

Personnel 
 Printz Board – producer, songwriter (album, "Reset", "Differently", "Mess of Mine", "Differently")
 Rodney Jerkins – producer (album)
 Wayne Wilkins – producer, songwriter (album, "Criminal", "No More")
 Jimmy Harry – producer, songwriter ("Don't Wanna Dance")
 Peter Zizzo – songwriter ("Reset")
 Leah Haywood – songwriter ("Do It Again")
 Dan James – songwriter ("Do It Again")
 Rug – songwriter ("Do It Again")
 Dream Lab – producer ("Do It Again")
 Richard Vission – producer, songwriter ("Nothing You Can Do")
 Chico Bennett – producer, songwriter ("Nothing You Can Do")
 Nina Woodford – songwriter ("No More")
 Travis McCoy – featured artist, co-writer ("Differently")

Release history

References

2009 debut albums